France Galop is the governing body of flat and steeplechase horse racing in France. It was founded on May 3, 1995, as the result of the amalgamation of four different industry organizations. Prominent owner/breeder Jean-Luc Lagardère was elected the organization's first president.

As of 2007 France Galop has a membership of more than 9,500 horse owners, trainers, jockeys, breeders, and officials. The organization is run by a 12-member board of directors and an oversight committee of fifty representatives.

Each year, France Galop organizes more than 6,500 races at racetracks throughout France and operates Longchamp Racecourse, Auteuil, and the Saint-Cloud Racecourse. The organization also organises steeplechase racing at Enghien Racecourse in Val-d'Oise. In addition, France Galop operates the racecourses and manages the training centres at Chantilly, Maisons-Laffitte and Deauville-La Touques and Deauville-Clairefontaine. 

France Galop also focuses on promoting the improvement French racehorse breeding. Along with the harness racing association, Société du Cheval Français, France Galop controls the voting rights of the PMU (pari-mutuel urbain) who manage track and off-track betting operations on their behalf. 

Édouard Étienne de Rothschild, owner of Haras de Meautry stud farm in Toques in Basse-Normandie, is the current president of France Galop. He was elected in 2004 to a four-year term.

References 
 France-Galop official website (French language)

Horse racing venue owners
Horse racing organizations
Horse racing in France